The Gen. William Hart House is a historic house at 350 Main Street in Old Saybrook, Connecticut.  Built in 1767 for a politician and colonial militia leader, it is a good example of Georgian residential architecture.  The house was listed on the National Register of Historic Places in 1972, and is a contributing property to the Old Saybrook South Green historic district.

Description and history
The General William Hart House stands on the east of Main Street (Connecticut Route 154) just south of the Grace Church in a residential portion of the village center of Old Saybrook.  It is a -story wood-frame structure, five bays wide, with a gabled roof, clapboarded exterior, and two end chimneys.  It has a center entry sheltered by a gable-roofed portico supported by Doric columns.  The interior follows a central hall plan, and retains a number of original features, including fireplace surrounds.

The house was built in 1767 by William Hart, Jr., a merchant, around the time of his marriage.  Hart served in the American Revolutionary War and was later a candidate for Governor of Connecticut.  The house was used later in the 19th century for a boarding school.  It is one of a number of well-preserved houses from the period in the residential area south of the commercial center of Old Saybrook.

Also located on the site are the Frank Stevenson Archives and the Hart House Gardens. The house and property are currently owned by the Old Saybrook Historical Society.

See also
National Register of Historic Places listings in Middlesex County, Connecticut

References

Houses completed in 1767
Houses on the National Register of Historic Places in Connecticut
Houses in Old Saybrook, Connecticut
Georgian architecture in Connecticut
National Register of Historic Places in Middlesex County, Connecticut
1767 establishments in Connecticut
Historic district contributing properties in Connecticut